Derek Dooley (born June 10, 1968) is an American football coach and former player who is a senior offensive analyst for the Alabama Crimson Tide. He served as the head football coach at Louisiana Tech University from 2007 to 2009 and the University of Tennessee from 2010 to 2012.

Early years
Dooley was born in Athens, Georgia, in 1968, the son of University of Georgia coach Vince Dooley and his wife, radio talk show host Barbara Meshad Dooley. Dooley played high school football at Clarke Central High School in Athens under legendary coach Billy Henderson. He was a star tight end on the school's 1985 AAAA State Championship team. Dooley played alongside other notable Clarke Central (and later NFL) players, including kicker John Kasay (Seattle Seahawks, Carolina Panthers, New Orleans Saints), defensive end and former University of Tennessee defensive line coach Chuck Smith (Atlanta Falcons, Carolina) and wide receiver Willie Green (Detroit Lions, Tampa Bay Buccaneers, Carolina Panthers, Denver Broncos).

Dooley was a walk-on wide receiver at the University of Virginia. He earned a scholarship with the Cavaliers following his second season and helped the school to three bowl appearances, including an ACC championship in 1989. In 1990, he was named first-team Academic All-ACC and participated in the Senior Bowl. He graduated in 1990 with a bachelor's degree in government and foreign affairs, and went on to earn his Juris Doctor (J.D.) degree from the University of Georgia School of Law in 1994. Dooley practiced law at Nelson Mullins Riley & Scarborough in Atlanta for almost two years before embarking on his coaching career.

College coaching career

Georgia
Dooley started his college coaching career with a one-year stint as a graduate assistant at the University of Georgia in 1996. This is where his father Vince Dooley was the athletic director and head football coach who won the 1980 national championship there.

SMU
Dooley spent the 1997–1999 seasons as the wide receivers coach at Southern Methodist University, while also holding the duties of assistant recruiting coordinator during his final two years at SMU.

LSU
In 2000, Dooley was hired by Nick Saban at LSU as the Tigers’ recruiting coordinator/tight ends coach, a capacity in which he served until 2002. Dooley then spent the 2003–04 seasons coaching the Tigers’ running backs and special teams, and in 2004 was named assistant head coach. In 2005, Dooley left LSU with Saban when the latter became head coach of the Miami Dolphins.

Louisiana Tech
On December 17, 2006, Dooley was hired as the new head coach at Louisiana Tech University. He replaced former coach Jack Bicknell, who was fired on December 4 after the Bulldogs finished 3–10 in 2006. From 2008 to 2009 Dooley was the only head football coach in the country who also served as the university's athletics director. In 2008, Dooley led Louisiana Tech to its first postseason victory in 30 years and was named the Louisiana Sports Writers’ Association Coach of the Year. Prior to becoming a head coach

On March 6, 2008, Dooley was named the Athletics Director of Louisiana Tech University replacing former AD Jim Oakes. During his tenure, Dooley implemented a complete overhaul of the infrastructure of the athletics department from staffing, to facilities, to external and internal operations of the athletic department from the ground up.

Tennessee
On January 15, 2010, Dooley was hired as the 22nd head coach at the University of Tennessee. He replaced Lane Kiffin, who resigned to become head coach at the University of Southern California after one season at Tennessee. Dooley had a challenging three seasons as the head coach at Tennessee. The only in-depth on the record discussion of his tenure was given nearly four years later during a live two-hour televised interview with Clay Travis of Fox Sports Outkick the Coverage in June 2016. Dooley inherited a program for which he would be the third head coach in three years. Perhaps due to these coaching changes, a number of scholarship players had left the University. The 2010 Tennessee Volunteer football team was expected by many to be one of the worst in school history.  With few scholarship players and a very young team, Tennessee started the season 2–6. However, they won their last four regular season games to finish the season 6–6 and become bowl eligible. Tennessee went on to lose the Music City Bowl to North Carolina on the last play of the game. In 2011, the team finished a disappointing 5–7, dropping the last game of the season to Kentucky, which ended a 26-game winning streak against the Wildcats. Combined with the 6–7 record of 2010, it was the first time since 1910–1911, that the Vols had finished with losing records in back to back seasons.

At the outset of the 2012 season the Vols had high hopes for a major turnaround. With returning star quarterback Tyler Bray back at the helm and star wide receiver Justin Hunter returning from injury the Vols were expected to tout an offense that could compete against the top SEC defenses. Boosting the offense from the start of the season was the emergence of community college transfer wide receiver Cordarrelle Patterson who became a big threat in both receiving and returning plays. However, another loss to the rival Florida Gators, a game in which the Vols were in control for a majority of time, sent the season sinking. The Vols lost six of the nine remaining games including a four-game losing streak. A heartbreaking 4OT loss to Missouri left many fans fed up with Dooley after a questionable call to play overtime rather than play for a game-winning field goal would deprive the Vols of a victory. A lop-sided 41-18 loss to in-state rival Vanderbilt was the final straw. Derek Dooley and the Volunteer football team went 5-7, with all 7 losses being to SEC teams. As a result, Tennessee recorded three consecutive losing seasons (2010, 2011 and 2012). Derek Dooley amassed the worst record of head coaches with more than two seasons in Tennessee history, and the worst overall since 1906. He also has the worst record of all Tennessee coaches in SEC play. On November 18, 2012, Dooley was fired from his head coaching position effective immediately, eventually being replaced by Butch Jones, the former head coach of the Cincinnati Bearcats.

Missouri
After a few years back in the NFL, Dooley returned to college, from 2018 until 2019 Dooley was the Offensive Coordinator and Quarterbacks Coach at the University of Missouri.
In his first season as offensive coordinator, Mizzou ended the 2018 season ranked 13th nationally (third in the SEC) in total offense (481.8 avg.), 18th nationally (third in the SEC) in scoring (36.6 avg.) and 18th nationally (third in the SEC) in third down conversions (46.4%). Dooley's offense also led the SEC in fewest QB sacks allowed (8th nationally) and fewest tackles for loss allowed (6th nationally).

Under Dooley's guidance, Mizzou was one of only three Power Five offenses to throw for at least 279 yards per game, while rushing for at least 200 yards per game. The other two were national champion Clemson (279 passing/248 rushing) and CFP semi-finalist Oklahoma (322 passing/247 rushing).

In the 2018 AutoZone Liberty Bowl, Dooley’s offense broke a school bowl-game record with 637 yards of total offense. In the game, Mizzou threw for 373 yards (including a program bowl-game record three passing touchdowns) while running for 264 more.

Dooley mentored quarterback Drew Lock, who was drafted by the Denver Broncos in the 2nd round of the 2019 NFL Draft. Under Dooley's guidance, Lock was a finalist for three major national awards (Manning Award, Unitas Golden Arm Award, Lowe's Senior CLASS Award) and earned second-team All-SEC honors for his outstanding play, which included 3,498 yards and 28 passing touchdowns, to go with a career-best six rushing scores. 

Dooley left after the 2019 season to return to the NFL.

Alabama
On February 16, 2022, Dooley was hired by Alabama to be their offensive analyst.

NFL coaching career

Miami Dolphins
Dooley was named to the Dolphins’ coaching staff as the tight ends coach on January 10, 2005 by Nick Saban, for whom Dooley had previously worked at Louisiana State University. Dooley served on the staff for two years, but left the Dolphins' staff in 2006 when he was chosen as the new head football coach at Louisiana Tech. He was an assistant coach under Nick Saban for seven years, which included a BCS National Championship at LSU in 2003.

Dallas Cowboys
On February 5, 2013, the Dallas Cowboys officially hired Dooley as their Wide Receivers coach. During his time, the Cowboys offense ranked in the top five in points per game (2014,2016); total yards (2016); pass yards per play (2014, 2016); third-down conversion percentage (2014); red zone conversion percentage (2014, 2016); and goal to go percentage(2014, 2016). In 2016, the Cowboys offense set an NFL-record eight consecutive games of 400-plus total net yards. Under Dooley's tutelage, Dez Bryant was selected to his only three Pro Bowls of his career, and in 2014 was named 1st Team All-Pro. In that same year, Bryant set the Dallas Cowboys record for most touchdowns in a season. Dooley's tenure included the development of Terrance Williams and undrafted free agent Cole Beasley. Williams is #7 in the NFL in Yards per reception from 2013-2016, and is ranked #5 in Cowboys history in touchdowns in first four seasons. Beasley was ranked as the most reliable slot receiver by Pro Football Focus. He ranked top 5 in the NFL in Catch Percentage (2014, 2016) and 3rd Down Receiving (2016).

New York Giants
On January 27, 2020 it was confirmed that Dooley would be a part of the Giants coaching staff under Joe Judge. For the 2021 season he was named as the team's tight ends coach, switching positions with Freddie Kitchens. He was not retained after the 2021 season.

Personal life
Dooley's wife is Dr. Allison Jeffers Dooley, who is an OB/GYN, and they have three children named John Taylor, Peyton, and Julianna. Peyton was diagnosed with Type 1 Diabetes in August 2014. Dooley currently serves on the board of the JDRF Dallas chapter. John Taylor is currently on the Georgia Bulldogs' football team as a wide receiver.

Before embarking on his coaching career, Dooley practiced law at Nelson Mullins Riley & Scarborough in Atlanta, Georgia. He is the son of former University of Georgia head football coach and athletic director Vince Dooley.

While at Tennessee, Dooley helped raise over $1 million for children and other causes in the local community. The Dooley's hosted the Big Orange Experience, an annual fundraising event for Variety, an organization that provides financial support for numerous children's charities. In 2012, some of the proceeds funded the Dooley-Witten Learning Center at the Halls/Powell Boys and Girls Club of the Tennessee Valley, a project on which Dooley teamed up with former Vol and Dallas Cowboys All-Pro Tight End Jason Witten.

Dooley's brother-in-law is former NFL wide receiver Patrick Jeffers.

Head coaching record

* Did not coach 12th game (fired)

References

External links

 Alabama profile

1968 births
Living people
American football wide receivers
Alabama Crimson Tide football coaches
Dallas Cowboys coaches
Georgia (U.S. state) lawyers
Georgia Bulldogs football coaches 
Louisiana Tech Bulldogs and Lady Techsters athletic directors
Louisiana Tech Bulldogs football coaches
LSU Tigers football coaches
Miami Dolphins coaches
Missouri Tigers football coaches 
New York Giants coaches
SMU Mustangs football coaches 
Tennessee Volunteers football coaches
Virginia Cavaliers football players
Sportspeople from Athens, Georgia
Coaches of American football from Georgia (U.S. state)
Players of American football from Georgia (U.S. state)